Robert Duncan MacIntyre (born 3 August 1996) is a Scottish professional golfer who plays on the European Tour.

Amateur career
MacIntyre had a successful amateur career. In 2013 he won both the Scottish Youths Championship and the Scottish Boys Open Stroke-Play Championship. He won the Scottish Amateur in 2015 and in 2016 he lost 2&1 to Scott Gregory in the final of the Amateur Championship at Royal Porthcawl Golf Club. MacIntyre represented Scotland in the 2016 Eisenhower Trophy and played in the 2017 Walker Cup. He attended McNeese State University from 2014 to 2015.

Professional career
MacIntyre turned professional in late 2017. In October, he played his first two events as a professional, on the MENA Golf Tour, finishing tied for third place in the Jordan's Ayla Golf Championship and then winning the Sahara Kuwait Championship.

In November 2017, MacIntyre made the final stage of the European Tour Q-school. He finished tied for 37th place to secure a 2018 Challenge Tour card. In August 2018, he lost to Kim Koivu in a playoff for the Vierumäki Finnish Challenge and then had an exceptional end to the season. He finished tied for fourth in the Monaghan Irish Challenge, lost a playoff to Víctor Perez in the Foshan Open and tied for 6th in the Ras Al Khaimah Challenge Tour Grand Final. His good finish to the season lifted him to 12th in the Challenge Tour Order of Merit, to earn a place on the European Tour for 2019.

MacIntyre was a joint runner-up in the 2019 Betfred British Masters, helped by an eagle-birdie finish. Two weeks later he was runner-up in the Made in Denmark tournament, a stroke behind Bernd Wiesberger. In July 2019, MacIntyre made his Open Championship debut at Royal Portrush, finishing in a tie for sixth. On 14 October, MacIntyre became the leading Scot on the Official World Golf Ranking for the first time after finishing in a tie for fourth at the Italian Open. MacIntyre finished the season as the leading rookie on the Race to Dubai rankings (11th place) which earned him the Sir Henry Cotton Rookie of the Year award.

In November 2020, MacIntyre claimed his first European Tour title at the Aphrodite Hills Cyprus Showdown. With the final round cut to 19 players due to knockout format of the event; MacIntyre's final round 64 was good to seal the victory and beat Masahiro Kawamura by one shot.

In September 2022, MacIntyre won his second European Tour event at the DS Automobiles Italian Open. He shot a final-round 64 to join Matt Fitzpatrick in a playoff. He won the playoff on the first extra hole with a birdie.

Personal life
MacIntyre played shinty as a teenager for Oban Camanachd. 

His cousins Oscar MacIntyre and Jacob MacIntyre are professional footballers.

Amateur wins
2011 SGU Junior Tour Event 2
2013 Scottish Youths Stroke Play, Scottish Boys Open Stroke Play
2014 Sir Henry Cooper Junior Masters
2015 Sam Hall Intercollegiate, Scottish Amateur, Wyoming Cowboy Classic (tied)
2016 Scottish Champion of Champions

Source:

Professional wins (3)

European Tour wins (2)

European Tour playoff record (1–0)

MENA Tour wins (1)

Playoff record
Challenge Tour playoff record (0–2)

Results in major championships
Results not in chronological order in 2020.

"T" = tied
NT = No tournament due to COVID-19 pandemic

Results in The Players Championship

CUT = missed the halfway cut

Results in World Golf Championships

1Cancelled due to COVID-19 pandemic

NT = No tournament
"T" = Tied
QF, R16, R32, R64 = Round in which player lost in match play
Note that the Championship and Invitational were discontinued from 2022.

Team appearances
Amateur
European Boys' Team Championship (representing Scotland): 2013, 2014
Jacques Léglise Trophy (representing Great Britain & Ireland): 2013 (winners)
Summer Youth Olympics (representing Great Britain & Northern Ireland): 2014
European Amateur Team Championship (representing Scotland): 2016 (winners), 2017
St Andrews Trophy (representing Great Britain and Ireland): 2016 (tie)
Eisenhower Trophy (representing Scotland): 2016
Walker Cup (representing Great Britain & Ireland): 2017

Professional
Hero Cup (representing Great Britain & Ireland): 2023

See also
2018 Challenge Tour graduates

References

External links

Scottish male golfers
European Tour golfers
Golfers at the 2014 Summer Youth Olympics
Left-handed golfers
McNeese Cowboys and Cowgirls
Sportspeople from Argyll and Bute
People from Oban
1996 births
Living people